Pierrick Brandon Leroy Keutcha (born 10 December 2001), known as Brandon Pierrick, is an English professional footballer who plays as a winger for Dover Athletic. He is a product of the Crystal Palace youth system.

Playing career
Pierrick began his career in the Crystal Palace Academy at the age of eight. He signed his first professional contract on his 18th birthday, and became the club's second-youngest Premier League debutant the following month. On 1 January 2020, he came off the bench in a 1–1 draw against Norwich City and started the move that led to Palace's late equaliser.

Pierrick then started in a 1–0 FA Cup Third Round defeat to Derby County four days later, before returning to regular action for the Under-23s. He made one further appearance during the 2019–20 season, coming off the bench for the final six minutes of a 4–0 defeat at Liverpool.

On 1 February 2021, Pierrick joined Scottish Premiership club Kilmarnock on loan until the end of the season.

In July 2021, Pierrick joined Danish Superliga club Vejle. In April 2022, Pierrick left the club after mutually agreeing to terminate his contract.

On February 23 2023, Pierrick signed for National League South side Dover Athletic.

Personal life
Pierrick is of Cameroonian descent and grew up in Brixton.

Career statistics

References

External links
 

2001 births
Living people
English footballers
English people of Cameroonian descent
Association football midfielders
Crystal Palace F.C. players
Kilmarnock F.C. players
Vejle Boldklub players
Dover Athletic F.C. players
Premier League players
Scottish Professional Football League players
Footballers from Lambeth
Black British sportspeople
English expatriate footballers
Expatriate footballers in Denmark
English expatriate sportspeople in Denmark